The third cabinet of Martti Miettunen was the 59th government of Finland. The government existed from 29 September 1976 to 15 May 1977. It was a minority government formed by the Centre Party, the Swedish People’s Party, and the Liberal People’s Party. The cabinet had economic problems to solve during the aftershock of the 1973 oil crisis.

Ministers 

  

Miettunen 3
1976 establishments in Finland
1977 disestablishments in Finland
Cabinets established in 1976
Cabinets disestablished in 1977